Teemu Henritius (born April 20, 1993) is a Finnish ice hockey player. His is currently playing with Sport in the Finnish SM-liiga.

Henritius made his SM-liiga debut playing with Jokerit during the 2011–12 SM-liiga season.

References

External links

1993 births
Living people
Finnish ice hockey right wingers
Jokerit players
Ice hockey people from Helsinki